Village Historique Acadien Provincial Park is an historical reconstruction that portrays the way of life of Acadians between 1770 and 1949.

More than 40 buildings are staffed by interpreters in period costume who bring ancestral customs and traditional trades to life. Among the attractions is Hôtel Château Albert, a replica of a turn-of the century hotel that once existed in Caraquet. The original was destroyed by fire in 1955 but it has been re-created at the Village. It offers overnight accommodations as well as a dining room.

Allow a minimum of 3 hours for a complete visit.

Recognition
It was a Phoenix Award Winner from the Society of American Travel Writers (1996)
and Attractions Canada (2001/2002)

Gallery

Affiliations
The Museum is affiliated with: CMA, CHIN, and Virtual Museum of Canada.

References

External links

 Village historique acadien 
 Webshots
 Description and review by writer Pat Mestern

History museums in New Brunswick
Living museums in Canada
Buildings and structures in Gloucester County, New Brunswick
Tourist attractions in Gloucester County, New Brunswick
Folk museums in Canada